Sanavin Sana (also Romanized as Sanāvīn Sanā; also known as S̄anā and Senā) is a village in Eram Rural District, Eram District, Dashtestan County, Bushehr Province, Iran. At the 2006 census, its population was 507, in 80 families.

References 

Populated places in Dashtestan County